Chojane may refer to several villages in the administrative district of Gmina Kulesze Kościelne, within Wysokie Mazowieckie County, Podlaskie Voivodeship, in north-eastern Poland:

Chojane-Bąki
Chojane-Gorczany
Chojane-Pawłowięta
Chojane-Piecki
Chojane-Sierocięta
Chojane-Stankowięta